Meja is the self-titled debut studio album by Swedish singer-songwriter Meja, released in 1996 by Epic Records. After being part of dance group Legacy of Sound since 1993, Meja met Lasse Karlsson, then-manager of Ace of Base, who introduced her to songwriter Douglas Carr, who went on to produce the album. Meja was a relative failure commercially in Sweden—only charting at number 29—but was a huge success in the Japanese market where it sold 600,000 copies.

Track listing

Chart positions

Certifications

In popular culture
The song "How Crazy Are You?" was featured in the video game Dead or Alive Xtreme Beach Volleyball for the Xbox, where it plays during the opening movie.

References

 

1996 debut albums
Meja albums